The 2017 SANFL Women's League season was the inaugural season of the SANFL Women's League (SANFLW). The season commenced on 17 February and concluded with the Grand Final on 1 April 2017. The competition was contested by four clubs, each affiliated with clubs from the men's South Australian National Football League (SANFL).

Clubs
 Glenelg
 North Adelaide
 Norwood
 West Adelaide

Ladder

Grand Final

References 

SANFL Women's League
SANFLW